Duseniella is a genus of Argentine flowering plants in the family Asteraceae.

There is only one known species, Duseniella patagonica, endemic to the Patagonia region of southern Argentina.

References

Barnadesioideae
Monotypic Asteraceae genera
Endemic flora of Argentina